Belozyorov, Belozyerov, or Belozerov and Belozyorova, Belozyerova, or Belozerova are masculine and feminine forms of a common Russian surname. 

Notable people with the surname Belozyorov include:
Aleksandr Belozyorov (footballer) (born 1981), Russian football player
Oleg Belozyorov (born 1969), a Russian politician and manager

Russian-language surnames